Ernst Dokupil (born 24 April 1947) is a retired Austrian footballer and coach.

External links
 official website
 Rapid Archiv

1947 births
Living people
Austrian footballers
Austrian Football Bundesliga players
Austrian football managers
FC Admira Wacker Mödling players
1. Simmeringer SC managers
FC Admira Wacker Mödling managers
SK Rapid Wien players
SK Rapid Wien managers
First Vienna FC managers
Association football midfielders